The Odyssey (French title: L'Odyssée) is a 2016 French-Belgian biographical adventure film directed by Jérôme Salle and written by Salle and Laurent Turner, based on the non-fiction book Capitaine de La Calypso by Albert Falco and Yves Paccalet. The film stars Lambert Wilson, Pierre Niney, and Audrey Tautou.

Premise
The film follows Jacques-Yves Cousteau, a French ocean-going adventurer, biologist, and filmmaker. It sticks to historical events, and was based on documentation and interviews with people who worked with Cousteau.

In 1949, Cousteau was an eccentric naval officer in France, with a beautiful oceanside house, who wanted to be a pilot. But he quits the Navy to explore and document the ocean. His boat, Calypso, was a 1941 minesweeper. The film is a biopic covering aquatic adventures over thirty years. Cousteau is revealed to be an adventurer but also an inventor. He designed the autonomous regulator, but also had romantic views of colonising the sea. The film documents the decline of his finances and fortunes and banks pull out as the era of 'robotics' and automation begins as a more plausible financial investment than Cousteau's ideas of civilizations living under the sea.  While he was influential and ambitious, he is revealed to be disloyal to his wife Simone, who remains on the Calypso year-round while Cousteau travels extensively. He conflicts with and is reconciled with his environmentalist son, Philippe, who is also a filmmaker. A major trip to Antarctica sees him working with his son and loyal crew, to make films he has promised to his investors and producing essential revenue as his business was failing. Cousteau is then showing gathering fame and travelling the world in the late 1970s. The death of Philippe on 28 June 1979, in a PBY Catalina flying boat crash in the Tagus river near Lisbon is the low point in Cousteau's life. 
Cousteau is shown to be a popularizer of the hidden wonders of the sea, and the person who raised the most awareness of the ocean and the need for environmental protection for many decades.  His role in brokering the moratorium on resource exploitation in Antarctica is mentioned in the closing credits.

Cast 
 Lambert Wilson as Jacques-Yves Cousteau
 Pierre Niney as Philippe Cousteau
  Ulysse Stein as young Philippe Cousteau
 Audrey Tautou as Simone Melchior Cousteau
 Laurent Lucas as Philippe Tailliez
 Benjamin Lavernhe as Jean-Michel Cousteau
 Rafaël de Ferran as young Jean-Michel Cousteau
 Vincent Heneine as Albert "Bebert" Falco
 Thibault de Montalembert as Étienne Deshaies
 Roger Van Hool as Daddy
 Chloé Hirschman as Jan
 Adam Neill as David Wolper
 Olivier Galfione as Frédéric Dumas
 Martin Loizillon as Henri Plé
 Chloé Williams as Eugenie Clark

Production 
Principal photography on the film began on 7 September 2015 in Croatia, where filming took place on islands Hvar, Vis, and Biševo. Shooting was also done in South Africa, Antarctic, and The Bahamas, and it ended on 8 January 2016.

Release 

In France, the film was released on 12 October 2016 by Wild Bunch.

Reception 
The film was regarded by critics and audiences as lacking direction and good character development. The undersea and Antarctica scenes were deemed to be stunning, and received an award. Rotten Tomatoes gave a score of 63% based on 19 reviews.

References

External links 
 

2016 films
Belgian biographical films
Films directed by Jérôme Salle
Pan-Européenne films
French biographical films
French historical adventure films
Belgian historical films
Biographical films about military personnel
Biographical films about scientists
Biographical films about writers
Biographical films about photographers
Films about film directors and producers
2010s biographical films
2010s historical adventure films
Films shot in Croatia
Films shot in South Africa
Films shot in Antarctica
Films shot in the Bahamas
Cultural depictions of Jacques Cousteau
Environmental films
Films set in the 1960s
Films set in the 1970s
Films featuring underwater diving
Films based on non-fiction books
French-language Belgian films
2010s French films